Oncicola is a genus of parasitic worms belonging to the family Oligacanthorhynchidae. Oncicola belongs to the phylum Acanthocephalans that include many thorny-headed worms. This family contains 12 genera including the genus Oncicola. Oncicola is a part of the phylum Acanthocephalans that include many thorny-headed worms. The name comes from the prefix onc- meaning “barbed” and -cola meaning “to inhabit” in Latin. It was named and discovered in 1916 by Travassos. These worms are defined by their parasitic nature which involves hook structures found at their front end.

Morphology 
Each worm is around 8-15 mm long with males typically being smaller than the females. They are typically white to yellow in color and globular shaped. They have a short proboscis at the front of the body with around 36 small hooks that vary in shape and size. These hooks are arranged into six rows with six hooks in each, and the proboscis itself varies in size from worm to worm. They also appear wrinkled along their body, and their body gets thinner towards the tail end. They have a cuticle, hypodermal layer with lacunar canals (which gives them the wrinkled appearance), and a long ribbon-like lemniscus that extends to the posterior end of the organism. Not much is known about the importance of the lemniscus, but it is thought that it aids in the transport of fluids to the proboscis and houses secondary sensory fibers. They are long structures that occupy a large part of the worm’s body, and they are largest in females. The cuticle is tough but flexible and protects the worm from its external environment and predation. In some senses it acts as an external skeleton for this animal. For many worms a new cuticle is made, and the old cuticle is sloughed off at each larval stage which allows the worm to grow. The hypodermal layer functions similar to that of vertebrates. It provides insulation, more protection, and a sink for excess energy. The worm lacks a digestive tract, a pseudocoelom, and reproductive organs as juveniles, but these features form as they grow into the adult form.

Parasitism 
Species belonging to the genus Oncicola can make a host of a wide variety of animals. They parasitize carnivorous mammals (such as armadillos, mongooses, feral cats, etc) and birds with Oncicola canis and Oncicola venezuelenis being the most prevalent species. The worms have been found in the abdominal wall, vaginal cavity, peritoneal cavity, and pericardium of both male and female hosts, typically of young adult age or older. Oncicola canis, specifically, can be found in the small intestine of dogs and cats. The worms use the hooks within their proboscis to attach deep to the intestinal wall of their host, most of the time they penetrate the muscle layer. Then they absorb nutrients through their body wall and lacunar channels on the hypodermis. Infections by this worm seem to cause little clinical symptoms, but some can cause moderate inflammation, mineralization, hemorrhaging, and fibrosis in some connective tissues within the host. Some hosts have also been found to have lymphocytes with fewer plasma cells. Although rare, infections by Oncicola could potentially cause problems in the host’s reproductive system because of the inflammation and fibrosis the parasite can cause. The eggs of this organism are typically found within the feces of the host, which is how they are spread, and they can be discovered using flotation techniques such as zinc sulfate treatments and Sheather’s sugar.

Life Cycle 
The life cycle begins as females lay thick-shelled oval eggs that are brown in color and around 43-50 x 67-72 mcm. They have delicate and clear external shell membranes and can survive a multitude of environmental conditions and for several months without being in a host. These eggs are normally found within the feces of the host containing the female worm. Dung beetles, or other paratenic hosts, may interact with the larvae and become intermediate hosts when they feed on egg-containing manure or soil. Inside the intestine of these hosts, or within the soil or manure, the larvae, also called the acanthor, develops into an acanthella. This maturation continues as the acanthella proceeds to the infective stage called a cystacanth. The cystacanth is the form that will infect a permanent host that will be used during reproduction; thus, this form is the most mature structurally and has all structures found in adult Oncicola. From here, the intermediate host may end up in an environment that is not suitable for the parasite’s life cycle. If this occurs, the development stops, but the cystacanth remains infective, waiting for better conditions to be present. If a more suitable host is not found, the worm’s life will end within the intermediate host, and no offspring will be produced. If the intermediate host is eaten by a definitive host, such as a dog, pig, fox, or cat, the life cycle can be completed. The worm will attach itself to the gut wall of the host, and if it is female, it will produce offspring that pass into the hosts feces.

Location 
The species of this genus are found in America and Australia. They have been found and documented in Brazil, the U.S. Virgin Islands, and the Caribbean Island of St. Kitts. There have been seven recorded sightings of Oncicola in Australia, mainly in the south of the country near the coast.

Species 
Species list:

	Oncicola campanulata (Diesing, 1851)
	Oncicola canis (Kaupp, 1909)
	Oncicola chibigouzouensis (Machado-Filho, 1963)
	Oncicola confuse
	Oncicola dimorpha
	Oncicola freitasi
	Oncicola gigas
	Oncicola juxtatesticularis
	Oncicola luehei (Travassos, 1917)
	Oncicola machadoi
	Oncicola macrurae
	Oncicola malayana
	Oncicola martini
	Oncicola michaelseni
	Oncicola micracantha
	Oncicola oncicola
	Oncicola paracampanulata
	Oncicola pomatostomi
	Oncicola schacheri
	Oncicola sigmoides
	Oncicola spirula
	Oncicola travassosi
	Oncicola venezuelensis

References

Archiacanthocephala
Acanthocephala genera